The Kid on the Mountain is an album by American guitarist Duck Baker that was released in 1980. It was reissued on CD in 1999 and 2013 with four bonus tracks.

Reception

Music critic Alex Henderson, writing for Allmusic, wrote the album "is hardly the work of a Celtic purist. But it's certainly the work of an artist who isn't afraid to take risks, and Baker's chance-taking spirit makes for an interesting, unorthodox project that can hardly be called generic."

Track listing
All songs traditional except where noted.

 "Medley: The Wicklow Hornpipe/Proudlock's Hornpipe" – 2:21	
"Blind Mary" – 3:01	
"The Blarney Pilgrim" – 2:20	
"Duke of Fife's Welcome to Deeside" – 2:07	
"Sir Sidney Smith's March" – 3:31	
"Bantry Bay" – 2:06	
"Morgan Magan" – 3:27	
"Kid on the Mountain" – 2:06	
"Medley: Fanteladda/Boys of Ballisodare" – 3:23	
"Rights of Man" – 2:47	
"Elsie Marley" – 1:41	
"Sheebeg and Sheemore" – 3:18	
"Lament for Limerick" – 4:48
Reissue bonus tracks:
"The March of the King of Laois" (Baker) –2:58	
"Medley: The South Wind/The Blackbird" – 3:40	
"No Love" (Baker) –2:00	
"Mardi Gras Dance" (Baker) – 1:35

Personnel
Duck Baker – acoustic guitar

Production
Duck Baker – producer
Stefan Grossman – executive producer, photography
Tom Leader – engineer
Nic Kinsey – engineer
Malcolm Davies – mastering
Bob Wagner – design

References

1980 albums
Duck Baker albums
Kicking Mule Records albums